Jozin may refer to:
 Jozin, Iran
 Józin, Sochaczew County, Poland
 Józin, Sokołów County, Poland